Anel Alejandro Canales Madrid (born March 15, 1978) is a football forward who most recently played for Luis Ángel Firpo of the Second Division of El Salvador.

Club career
A much travelled winger or striker, Canales had spells at several Panamanian sides, most notably with Chorrillo and Tauro.

Nicknamed Anelca, he played in El Salvador for Once Municipal, Alianza, Chalatenango, Isidro Metapán, whom he joined in January 2009, returning for a second spell in May 2010 and Luis Ángel Firpo. In December 2007, he was deemed not eligible to play for Chalatenango after the FEDEFUT disciplinary committee confirmed he played for three different teams in the 2007–2008 season, which is prohibited by FIFA. He played over 200 league games in El Salvador and scored over 100 goals.

He also spent time in Colombia with Envigado alongside compatriots Joel Solanilla and Luis Moreno and in Ecuador with Técnico Universitario for whom he made his debut in August 2007.

A tall striker, Canales was part of a tenth-title winning Salvadoran side Luis Ángel Firpo in 2013, but eventually was relegated with the club in May 2014, the club went down after 32 years of top flight football. He then announced he would return to Panama.

International career
He made his debut for Panama in June 2001 friendly match against Trinidad and Tobago and has earned a total of 15 caps, scoring 2 goals. He represented his country at the 2003 and 2007 UNCAF Nations Cups.

His final international was a June 2009 friendly match against Jamaica.

International goals
Scores and results list Panama's goal tally first.

Honors

Club
Liga Panameña de Fútbol (1):
2001-02
Salvadoran Primera División (2):
2009 (C), 2010 (A)

Individual
Liga Panameña de Fútbol Top Scorer (2):
2002 (C), 2003 (A)

References

External links
 Profile at El Grafico 
 
 

1978 births
Living people
Sportspeople from Panama City
Association football forwards
Panamanian footballers
Panama international footballers
2003 UNCAF Nations Cup players
2007 UNCAF Nations Cup players
Unión Deportivo Universitario players
Panamá Viejo players
Tauro F.C. players
San Francisco F.C. players
Once Municipal footballers
Envigado F.C. players
Alianza F.C. footballers
C.D. Técnico Universitario footballers
C.D. Chalatenango footballers
C.D. Luis Ángel Firpo footballers
A.D. Isidro Metapán footballers
Categoría Primera A players
Panamanian expatriate footballers
Expatriate footballers in El Salvador
Expatriate footballers in Ecuador
Expatriate footballers in Colombia
Liga Panameña de Fútbol players